The Copa América is South America's major tournament in senior men's soccer and determines the continental champion. Until 1967, the tournament was known as South American Championship. It is the oldest continental championship in the world.

Ecuador are one of only two CONMEBOL members who have never won a continental title, the other one being Venezuela. Both teams have never even placed in the top three.

With six goals in 1963, Carlos Alberto Raffo became that tournament's top scorer and the only Ecuadorian to ever receive an individual award at a continental championship. In spite of Raffo's goals, however, Ecuador only placed sixth out of seven nations that year.

Overall record

Record by opponent

Ecuador fell victim to the highest defeat in tournament history when they were beaten 12–0 by Argentina in 1942.

Their own highest victory was a 6–1 win against Venezuela in 1993. Venezuela is the only other CONMEBOL member, against which Ecuador have a positive head-to-head record.

Record players

Álex Aguinaga took part in eight Copa Américas. The only other player with that number of tournaments is Uruguayan striker Ángel Romano who competed in a time when the continental championship was held annually.

Top goalscorers

Awards and records

Individual awards
 Top scorer 1963: Carlos Alberto Raffo (6 goals)

Team records

 Most goals conceded (311)
 Most matches until first victory (34, 4–1 against Colombia in 1949)
 Highest defeat (0–12, against Argentina in 1942)
 Match with most goals (12, Argentina 12-0 Ecuador in 1942)

Individual records

 Most tournament participations: Álex Aguinaga (8, 1987–2004) (shared with Ángel Romano, 1916–1926)
 Longest time span between first and last match: Álex Aguinaga (17y 9d, 4 July 1987, against Peru at age 18 – 13 July 2004, against Mexico at age 36)
 Most own goals in one match: Honorato Gonzabay (2, 2–4 against Peru in 1955)

References

External links
RSSSF archives and results
Soccerway database

Countries at the Copa América
Ecuador national football team